Chkhalta is a village in the upper part of the Kodori Valley, situated in Gulripshi District, Abkhazia, a breakaway republic from Georgia.

History
Prior to August 2008, Chkhalta was part of 'Upper Abkhazia', the only part of Abkhazia controlled by the Georgian government. During the August 2008 war in South Ossetia, Abkhazian forces gained control of Chkhalta and the rest of Upper Abkhazia.  Most of Chkalta's inhabitants fled the advancing troops and have yet to return.

See also
 2007 Georgia helicopter incident
 Gulripshi District

References 

Upper Abkhazia
Populated places in Gulripshi District